Santiago González and Travis Rettenmaier were the defending champions, but Rettenmaier chose to play in the Estoril Open.
González teamed up with Igor Zelenay of Slovakia, but they were eliminated by František Čermák and Filip Polášek who eventually won the title; beating in the final the Austrian pair Oliver Marach and Alexander Peya 7–5, 6–2.

Seeds

Draw

Draw

References
 Main Draw

Serbia Open
Serbia Open - Doubles